P. V. Parabrahma Sastry (1920–2016) was an archeologist, historian, epigraphist and numismatist who held the rank of a deputy director in the Archaeology Department of United Andhra Pradesh Government.

Early life
Sastry was a native of Pedda Konduru in Guntur district. His ancestors had settled in Hyderabad.

Achievements
Sastry was selected for the National Fellowship  of the Indian Council of Historical Research. Sastry was one of the two persons selected for the fellowship in the year 2015. The ICHR is a premier historical research body under the HRD ministry. Dr Sastry was awarded a PhD by Karnataka University for his work on the history of the Kakatiya dynasty and early socio-economic conditions of Andhra Pradesh from 500 BC to 1000 AD. He worked with the Department of Archaeology and Museums until 1981. He conducted village-wise epigraphical surveys in the Telangana districts.

His contributions to Telugu historical research was mentioned in the pre-release events of the movie Gautamiputra Satakarani based on the archaeological and historical research on the Satavahana dynasty that he conducted.

Works
Sastry has written historical and archaeological works and in collaboration with other historians. His works include:

 Epigraphia Andhrica
 Rural Studies in Early Andhra in which he traced the historical origins of the Kamma caste.
Unknown Coins
Researches In Archaeology, History & Culture In The New Millennium - Dr. P.V. Parabrahma Sastry Felicitation Volume
Telugu lipi, āvirbhāva vikāsālu
Kākatīya caritra
Kākatīya coins and measures
Inscriptions of Andhra Pradesh : Karimnagar District
The Kākatiyas of Warangal
Select epigraphs of Andhra Pradesh
Siddhōdvāha of Nr̥isiṁha

Death and legacy
Sastry died at the age of 96 on 27 July 2016, due to prolonged illness. He is survived by his wife, three daughters and a son.

References

20th-century Indian archaeologists
20th-century Indian linguists
21st-century Indian archaeologists
Indian epigraphers
Indian numismatists
1920 births
2016 deaths
People from Guntur district
Scientists from Andhra Pradesh